The following lists events that happened during 2005 in Namibia.

Incumbents
President: Sam Nujoma (until 21 March), Hifikepunye Pohamba (from 21 March)
Prime Minister: Theo-Ben Gurirab (until 21 March), Nahas Angula (from 21 March)
Chief Justice: Peter Shivute

Events
 Sam Nujoma Stadium in Katutura, Windhoek is completed.

March
 13 March - The Namibian Air Force was commissioned at Grootfontein Air Force Base.
 21 March - Hifikepunye Pohamba is inaugurated as the 2nd President of Namibia following Sam Nujoma, who had been President since 1989. The Cabinet and 4th National Assembly were also sworn-in.

Deaths
 15 June: Blythe Loutit, conservationist
 November: Armas Johannes, well-known singer.
 3 November: Mwetupunga Kornelius Shelungu, King (Ohamba) of the Ovakwanyama
 19 November: Job Kozonguizi, Deputy Prosecutors General and nephew of Fanuel Kozonguizi.
 28 November: Victor Weyulu, Chairman of the Oukwanyama Traditional Authority.
 7 December: Otto Schimming, first Black teacher and independence activist.
 22 December: Markus Kooper, anti-apartheid activist.

References

 
Namibia
Years of the 21st century in Namibia
2000s in Namibia
Namibia